Ohland may refer to:

Individuals
Matthew Ohland, American engineer
Hermann Ohland (1888–1953), German professor, parson, religious and national lyricist, Thuringia
Max Ohland (1879–1933), German politician (Social Democratic Party), Saxony-Anhalt

Other
Ohland Bay